Dragsfjärd is a former municipality of Finland. On 1 January 2009 it was consolidated with Kimito and Västanfjärd to form the new municipality of Kimitoön.

It is located in the province of Western Finland and is part of the Southwest Finland region. The municipality had a population of 3,378 (2004-12-31) and covered an area of 274.95 km2 of which 8.17 km2 is water. The population density was 12.66 inhabitants per km2.

Western part of the municipality belongs to the Southwestern Archipelago National Park and forms the eastern part of the park.

The municipality was bilingual with 76% of the population being Swedish speakers and 21% being Finnish speakers.

People from Dragsfjärd
Artur Wuorimaa (1854 – 1921)
Wilhelm Ramsay (1865 – 1928)
Gottfrid Lindström (1887 – 1975)
Allan Wallenius (1890–1942) 
Olavi Saarinen (1923 – 1979)
Conny Karlsson (1975 – )

External links 

 Official website – in Swedish and Finnish

Populated places disestablished in 2009
2009 disestablishments in Finland
Former municipalities of Finland
Kimitoön